Salisbury Green is an eighteenth-century house, on the Pollock Halls of Residence site of the University of Edinburgh.

Originally built around 1780 by Alexander Scott, it is one of the two original buildings on site, along with St Leonard's Hall.

From 1820, the house was extended repeatedly. In 1860-67 the architect John Lessels remodelled in house in baronial style, for the publisher William Nelson (1816–1887), of the Thomas Nelson publishing company.

The university acquired the building after World War II and it was extended again in 1979. Several of its public rooms have been restored including the bow-fronted drawing room to the east, the Red Room with ebony fittings and the oak-panelled billiard room. Its interior includes rich painting by Charles Frechou. In 2006, Salisbury Green was given a thorough refurbishment, and is now operated by the university as the Salisbury Green Hotel. It no longer houses students.

The building (including its boundary walls) has been category A listed since December 1970.

References

External links 
 

Houses completed in 1780
Houses completed in 1867
Category A listed buildings in Edinburgh
Hotels in Edinburgh
Listed hotels in Scotland
Buildings and structures of the University of Edinburgh
Hotels established in 2006
2006 establishments in Scotland
1780 establishments in Scotland